In seven-dimensional geometry, a pentellated 7-cube is a convex uniform 7-polytope with 5th order truncations (pentellation) of the regular 7-cube.

Pentellated 7-cube

Alternate names
 Small  hepteract (acronym:) (Jonathan Bowers)

Images

Pentitruncated 7-cube

Alternate names
 Teritruncated hepteract (Jonathan Bowers)

Images

Penticantellated 7-cube

Alternate names
 Terirhombated hepteract (Jonathan Bowers)

Images

Penticantitruncated 7-cube

Alternate names
 Terigreatorhombated hepteract (Jonathan Bowers)

Pentiruncinated 7-cube

Alternate names
 Teriprismated hepteract (Jonathan Bowers)

Images

Pentiruncitruncated 7-cube

Alternate names
 Teriprismatotruncated hepteract (Jonathan Bowers)

Images

Pentiruncicantellated 7-cube

Alternate names
 Teriprismatorhombated hepteract (Jonathan Bowers)

Images

Pentiruncicantitruncated 7-cube

Alternate names
 Terigreatoprismated hepteract (Jonathan Bowers)

Images

Pentistericated 7-cube

Alternate names
 Tericellated hepteract (Jonathan Bowers)

Images

Pentisteritruncated 7-cube

Alternate names
 Tericellitruncated hepteract (Jonathan Bowers)

Images

Pentistericantellated 7-cube

Alternate names
 Tericellirhombated hepteract (Jonathan Bowers)

Images

Pentistericantitruncated 7-cube

Alternate names
 Tericelligreatorhombated hepteract (Jonathan Bowers)

Images

Pentisteriruncinated 7-cube

Alternate names
 Bipenticantitruncated 7-cube as t1,2,3,6{4,35}
 Tericelliprismated hepteract (Jonathan Bowers)

Images

Pentisteriruncitruncated 7-cube

Alternate names
 Tericelliprismatotruncated hepteract (Jonathan Bowers)

Images

Pentisteriruncicantellated 7-cube

Alternate names
 Bipentiruncicantitruncated 7-cube as t1,2,3,4,6{4,35}
 Tericelliprismatorhombated hepteract (Jonathan Bowers)

Images

Pentisteriruncicantitruncated 7-cube

Alternate names
 Great  hepteract (acronym:) (Jonathan Bowers)

Images

Related polytopes 

These polytopes are a part of a set of 127 uniform 7-polytopes with B7 symmetry.

Notes

References
 H.S.M. Coxeter:
 H.S.M. Coxeter, Regular Polytopes, 3rd Edition, Dover New York, 1973
 Kaleidoscopes: Selected Writings of H.S.M. Coxeter, edited by F. Arthur Sherk, Peter McMullen, Anthony C. Thompson, Asia Ivic Weiss, Wiley-Interscience Publication, 1995,  Wiley: Kaleidoscopes: Selected Writings of H.S.M. Coxeter
 (Paper 22) H.S.M. Coxeter, Regular and Semi Regular Polytopes I, [Math. Zeit. 46 (1940) 380-407, MR 2,10]
 (Paper 23) H.S.M. Coxeter, Regular and Semi-Regular Polytopes II, [Math. Zeit. 188 (1985) 559-591]
 (Paper 24) H.S.M. Coxeter, Regular and Semi-Regular Polytopes III, [Math. Zeit. 200 (1988) 3-45]
 Norman Johnson Uniform Polytopes, Manuscript (1991)
 N.W. Johnson: The Theory of Uniform Polytopes and Honeycombs, Ph.D.
  x3o3o3o3o3x4o, x3x3o3o3o3x4o, x3o3x3o3o3x4o, x3x3x3oxo3x4o, x3o3o3x3o3x4o, x3x3o3x3o3x4o, x3o3x3x3o3x4o, x3x3x3x3o3x4o, x3o3o3o3x3x4o, x3x3o3o3x3x4o, x3o3x3o3x3x4o, x3x3x3o3x3x4o, x3o3o3x3x3x4o, x3x3o3x3x3x4o, x3o3x3x3x3x4o, x3x3x3x3x3x3o

External links 
 Polytopes of Various Dimensions
 Multi-dimensional Glossary

7-polytopes